Missing is Taiwanese Mandopop artist Lala Hsu's fourth Mandarin solo studio album. It was released by AsiaMuse on 13 June 2014.

Track listing

 Notes
 "只要一分鐘 (One Minute More)" is the theme song of the 2014 film of the same name.

Music videos

Awards and nominations

References

External links
  Asiamuse - 尋人啟事
  myMusic 徐佳瑩 - 尋人啟事

2014 albums
Lala Hsu albums